Yin Hang or Hang Yin is the name of:

Hang Yin (scientist) (born 1976), Chinese-born biochemist at the University of Colorado Boulder, USA
(born 1988),French actress of Chinese origin born on 
Yin Hang (table tennis) (born 1994), Chinese table tennis player
Yin Hang (racewalker) (born 1997), Chinese racewalker